Ângelo Sampaio Benedetti, or simply Ângelo (born April 7, 1981 in Campinas), is a Brazilian football  defensive midfielder. He currently plays for Esporte Clube São Bento.

Ângelo has played for Ponte Preta and Fluminense in the Campeonato Brasileiro.

References

1981 births
Living people
Brazilian footballers
Sportspeople from Campinas
Association football midfielders
Associação Atlética Ponte Preta players
Fluminense FC players
América Futebol Clube (RN) players
Guaratinguetá Futebol players
Esporte Clube São Bento players
Ituano FC players
Sport Club Barueri players
Joinville Esporte Clube players